San Salvador de Quije is one of 11 districts of the Sucre Province in the Ayacucho region in Peru.

Population
The population of San Salvador de Quije (2005 census) is 1,525 people, 788 men and 737 women.

Ethnic groups 
The people in the district are mainly indigenous citizens of Quechua descent. Quechua is the language which the majority of the population (95.86%) learnt to speak in childhood, 3.94% of the residents started speaking using the Spanish language (2007 Peru Census).

Administrative division
The populated places in the district are:
 San Salvador de Quije
 Lluchcanta
 Chilcabamba
 Huanchos
 Huacha Huacha
 Chirihuaycco
 Toccyascca
 Potongo
 Huayhuani
 Irapata
 Accobamba
 Lleocca
 Molle Pata
 Huampo
 Orccochacra
 Rojasccata
 Huaychilla
 Humalucha
 Pacpaca
 Comunpampa
 Huito
 Ccochcca
 Pallcca
 Chiuchirilla
 Gailaccocha
 pallccacha
 Pichuspata
 Vista Alegre
 Ayapata
 Mollepampa
 Matara
 Ccocha Pata
 Ccarahuisa

References